Haedar Nashir (born February 25, 1958) is an Indonesian Islamic scholar and the current leader of Muhammadiyah, the second largest Muslim religious organization in the world. He was elected as the organization's leader on August 6, the same day that his wife Siti Noordjannah Djohantini was elected to a second term as the leader of Aisyiyah.

Nashir expressed concern regarding the Jakarta November 2016 protests surrounding the blasphemy trial of the Christian Governor of Jakarta, Basuki Tjahaja Purnama. Although Nashir welcomed the trial as evidence of objective law enforcement and encouraged citizens to monitor for transparency and rule of law, he indicated that "precious energy and time that could have otherwise been used to do something productive" had been lost. He also reiterated Muhammadiyah's support for President of Indonesia Joko Widodo, the Indonesian National Police and Indonesia's religious diversity.

References

Indonesian Islamic religious leaders
Indonesian Sunni Muslims
Living people
Muhammadiyah
Sunni Muslim scholars of Islam
1958 births
People from Bandung
Gadjah Mada University alumni